Drellingore is a village in South East Kent, England. It lies in the Alkham Valley, an area of outstanding natural beauty between Folkestone and Dover. Although the Alkham Valley is a dry valley most of the surrounding land forms a water catchment area. Water is extracted from the chalk aquifer for use in the Dover to Folkestone area of Kent. The population is included in the civil parish of Aylesham.

References

Villages in Kent